Mikhaylovka is a rural locality (a selo) in Zakamensky District, Republic of Buryatia, Russia. The population was 1,122 as of 2010. There are 17 streets.

Geography 
Ust-Burgaltay is the nearest rural locality.

References 

Rural localities in Zakamensky District